Ashley Darel Jazz Richards (born 12 April 1991) is a Welsh footballer who plays as a full-back for Cymru Premier club Haverfordwest County.

A versatile player who is also capable of playing at left-back and as a midfielder, Richards began his professional career at his hometown club Swansea City, having previously played youth football for their local rivals Cardiff City. He made only 51 appearances for the club in all competitions during a six-year spell with the first team.

During his time with the Swans, he spent time on loan with Crystal Palace, Huddersfield Town and Fulham, before joining the latter for an undisclosed fee in 2015. He established himself in Fulham's first team for a brief period. In 2016, he returned to Cardiff City, helping the club win promotion to the Premier League in 2018.

He signed for Haverfordwest County on 6 March 2021 on a contract until the end of the season.

Richards made his full international debut for Wales in 2012, and represented the nation at UEFA Euro 2016. To date, he has won 14 caps for his country.

Club career

Swansea City

Youth and first–team breakthrough

Born in Swansea, Richards played local football for his schools and local club West End, before joining the Cardiff City Academy. After two seasons, he was released and joined the academy at their South Wales rivals Swansea City at the age of fifteen. Richards initially started out as a central midfielder but switched to playing as a defender under manager Roberto Martínez due to the increased competition between midfielders in the first team at the time. He has since continued to play at that position as well. Richards earned £60 a week while on a scholarship with the Swans. He then signed his first professional contract with the team.

After spending two seasons with the academy and reserve sides, Richards made his professional debut for Swansea in a Championship match against Middlesbrough during a 3–0 loss on 15 August 2009, replacing Shaun MacDonald as a substitute in the 63rd minute. After Richards made 15 appearances during the 2009–10 season, he signed a new two-year deal with Swansea.

The start of the 2010–11 season saw Richards spend the opening six months as an unused substitute or in the reserve side. He did not make his first appearance of the season until 3 January 2011, during a 2–1 defeat against Leicester City following a defensive injury crisis where several first team players were ruled out. Throughout January and February, Richards was given a handful of first team opportunities. However, he lost his first team place for the remainder of the season following the return of Àngel Rangel from injury. He made eight appearances during the 2010–11 season as Swansea went on to become the first Welsh team ever to gain promotion to the Premier League.

After appearing on the bench for several matches at the start of the following season, Richards made his Premier League debut when he came on as a substitute for Neil Taylor during a 3–1 loss to Norwich City on 15 October 2011. Twelve days later, he was rewarded with a new 18-month contract. He then made his first start for the club in the Premier League, playing in a 4–2 loss against Blackburn Rovers on 3 December 2011. As the 2011–12 season progressed, Richards was sent to play in the reserves for the rest of the season, in order to regain his fitness. He finished the season with eight appearances.

Loan to Crystal Palace in 2013
At the start of the 2012–13 season, Richards struggled to break into the first team over Rangel in the right-back position. Because of this, he stated his desire to leave the club on loan to gain experience and compete for his spot in the first team. However, he was forced to wait until the winter transfer window to secure a move. In the first half of the season, he made just four appearances for Swansea, all in cup competitions. At the end of January, he joined Crystal Palace on loan until the end of the season. He made his debut for the club five days later, on 30 January 2013 in a 1–0 loss against Huddersfield Town. In his next match, against Charlton Athletic, Richards assisted Glenn Murray's winning goal, as Palace defeated their South London rivals 2–1. During his loan spell, he signed a new contract with Swansea until June 2016. He went on to make 11 appearances and appeared as an unused substitute in the 2013 Championship play-off final, as Palace beat Watford 1–0 to achieve promotion to the Premier League.

Loan to Huddersfield Town
After returning to Swansea, Richards made his first appearance of the 2013–14 season in the second leg of the Europa League qualifiers, a 0–0 draw against Malmö, helping Swansea advance 4–0 on aggregate. On 10 September 2013, Richards joined Championship side Huddersfield Town on a 93-day emergency loan. After not being able to obtain international clearance from FIFA in time to play against Doncaster Rovers on 14 September, he made his Town debut as a substitute in a 2–1 win over Charlton Athletic on 17 September 2013. His loan spell ended on 17 December after just 9 appearances for the Terriers. Following his return from his loan spell, Richards did not appear in another match until 16 February 2014 when he made played in a 3–1 loss against Everton in the last-sixteen of the FA Cup. He made no further appearances during the remainder of the season.

Return to Swansea
In the 2014–15 season, Richards made his first appearance of the season in the first round of the League Cup, in a 1–0 win over Rotherham United on 26 August 2014. He then made his first Premier League appearance in two years when he came on as a substitute in the 82nd minute of a 0–0 draw against Sunderland on 27 September 2014. Following this, Richards was given a handful of first team appearances throughout 2014 despite struggling to compete with Rangel and suffering his own injury concerns. In a 2–1 loss against Tottenham Hotspur on 14 December 2014, Richards made an error that led to Christian Eriksen scoring the winning goal. After the match, he issued an apology to Swansea City supporters for his error. Despite his apology, he became a victim of abuse on social media website Twitter by Swansea City supporters. Manager Garry Monk backed Richards and picked him in the club's following fixture against Hull City.

This turned out to be Richards' last season with Swansea. In six years, he made just 51 appearances for the club and never established himself as a regular. Only 18 of his appearances coming in the Premier League. His lone match in the 2013–14 Europa League qualifiers was his only appearance in a European competition for the club.

Fulham
On 24 January 2015, Richards joined Championship side Fulham on a one-month loan deal. He made his debut for the club on 31 January 2015, starting in a 2–1 loss against Blackburn Rovers. After making five appearances, Richards had his loan spell with Fulham extended until the end of the season. Richards went on to make 14 appearances for the Cottagers, all of which were starts.

On 2 July 2015, Swansea accepted Fulham's bid for Richards to transfer on a permanent deal. He signed a three-year deal with the option of a fourth, for an undisclosed fee. Although his year was marked with injuries, Richards' made 22 appearances in his only season as a permanent player at the club. He established himself as a regular when he was fit. However, ahead of the 2016–17 season, Richards was expected to lose his first team place at Fulham, with manager Slaviša Jokanović preferring Ryan Fredericks in the right-back position. As a result, Fulham accepted a bid from Cardiff City for Richards.

Cardiff City
On 19 July 2016, Richards joined Championship club Cardiff City on a three-year-deal in a swap move which saw Scott Malone join Fulham. He made his debut in a goalless draw at Birmingham City, where he became embroiled in controversy after reportedly refusing to do Cardiff's traditional ayatollah gesture, performed by fans of the club, several times at the match. However, the club later released video footage that showed him performing the gesture.

After starting the season as a regular in the first team, Richards suffered a training injury in September that led to him missing three months of the season. His lengthy rehabilitation prompted manager Neil Warnock to quip "I've had lads with broken legs recover quicker than him." He eventually made his return on 2 January, as unused substitute against Aston Villa. He enjoyed an extended run in the first team soon after, playing in ten of the club's following twelve matches, stating that he felt that he had "a lot more to show. I think I'm nowhere near my full potential." In his first season with Cardiff, he appeared in a career high 26 league matches.

At the start of the following season, Richards again suffered an injury blow early in the season, being forced to undergo surgery after hurting his ankle during 2–1 victory over Sunderland on 23 September 2017. He returned from injury in January 2018, playing in five matches before his season was ended by a further injury. He made only eleven appearances in all competitions during the season as Cardiff achieved promotion after finishing as runners-up. Richards was released by Cardiff when his contract finished at the end of the 2019–20 season.

Haverfordwest County
In March 2021, Richards joined Cymru Premier side Haverfordwest County on a contract until the end of the season. In May 2021, Richards signed a contract extension to keep him at the club until the end of the 2021–22 season.

International career
Richards represented the Wales under-17 and under-19 sides. He was called up to the under-21 squad for the first time in March 2009 to face Luxembourg. He won ten or more caps at all three levels during his youth career.

On 27 May 2012, he gained his first full international cap for Wales in their 2–0 friendly loss to Mexico in New Jersey, replacing Neil Taylor for the last ten minutes of the match. Wales qualified for Euro 2016 and Richards was called up into the final 23-man squad. He played his only game in the tournament as a late substitute in the team's first match, a 2–1 victory over Slovakia.
Wales went on to reach the semi-finals before losing to Portugal. As of October 2018, Richards has had 14 international caps with Wales, including seven appearances in the starting lineup. He played in four matches in Euro 2016 qualifying and three in 2018 World Cup qualifying.

Career statistics

Club

International

Personal life
Richards' comes from a family with a sporting background as his cousin Eli Walker is a professional athlete. Walker is a rugby union player.

References

External links

Profile at the Cardiff City F.C. website

1991 births
Living people
Footballers from Swansea
Welsh footballers
Wales youth international footballers
Wales under-21 international footballers
Wales international footballers
Association football defenders
Swansea City A.F.C. players
Crystal Palace F.C. players
Huddersfield Town A.F.C. players
Fulham F.C. players
Cardiff City F.C. players
Haverfordwest County A.F.C. players
Premier League players
English Football League players
Cymru Premier players
UEFA Euro 2016 players
West End F.C. players